Hebius boulengeri is a species of snake in the family Colubridae. The species is native to East Asia and Southeast Asia. It is also known commonly as the Tai-yong keelback or Boulenger's keelback.

Etymology
The specific name, boulengeri, is in honor of Belgian-British herpetologist George Albert Boulenger.

Geographic range
H. boulengeri is found in Cambodia, China, and Vietnam.

Habitat
The preferred natural habitats of H. boulengeri are forest and freshwater streams and wetlands. It is also found in rice paddies.

Diet
H. boulengeri preys upon fishes and amphibians.

Reproduction
H. boulengeri is oviparous.

References

Further reading
Gressitt, J. Linsley (1937). "A New Snake from Southeastern China". Proceedings of the Biological Society of Washington 50: 125–128. (Natrix boulengeri, new species).

Reptiles described in 1937
Reptiles of China
Reptiles of Vietnam
Reptiles of Cambodia
boulengeri
Snakes of China
Snakes of Vietnam
Snakes of Asia